The 2023 Mizoram Legislative Assembly election is scheduled to be held in or before November-December 2023 to elect all 40 members of the state's Legislative Assembly. Zoramthanga is expected to be the incumbent chief minister at the time of the election.

Background 
The tenure of Mizoram Legislative Assembly is scheduled to end on 17 December 2023. The previous assembly elections were held in November 2018. After the election, Mizo National Front formed the state government, with Zoramthanga becoming Chief Minister.

Schedule

Parties and alliances









References

State Assembly elections in Mizoram
M
2023 State Assembly elections in India